Portugal participated in the Eurovision Song Contest 2008 with the song "Senhora do mar (negras águas)" written by Andrej Babić and Carlos Coelho. The song was performed by Vânia Fernandes. The Portuguese broadcaster Rádio e Televisão de Portugal (RTP) organised the national final Festival da Canção 2008 in order to select the Portuguese entry for the 2008 contest in Belgrade, Serbia. The competition took place on 9 March 2008 where the winner was selected exclusively by public televoting. "Senhora do mar (negras águas)" performed by Vânia Fernandes emerged as the winner with 17,650 votes.

Portugal was drawn to compete in the second semi-final of the Eurovision Song Contest which took place on 22 May 2008. Performing as the closing entry during the show in position 19, "Senhora do mar (negras águas)" was announced among the 10 qualifying entries of the second semi-final and therefore qualified to compete in the final on 24 May. This marked the first time that Portugal qualified to the final of the Eurovision Song Contest from a semi-final since the introduction of semi-finals in 2004. It was later revealed that Portugal placed second out of the 19 participating countries in the semi-final with 120 points. In the final, Portugal performed in position 13 and placed thirteenth out of the 25 participating countries with 69 points.

Background

Prior to the 2008 contest, Portugal had participated in the Eurovision Song Contest forty-one times since its first entry in 1964. The nation's highest placing in the contest was sixth, which they achieved in 1996 with the song "O meu coração não tem cor" performed by Lúcia Moniz. Following the introduction of semi-finals for the 2004, Portugal had, to this point, yet to feature in a final. Portugal's least successful result has been last place, which they have achieved on three occasions, most recently in 1997 with the song "Antes do adeus" performed by Célia Lawson. Portugal has also received nul points on two occasions; in 1964 and 1997. The nation failed to qualify to the final in 2007 with the song "Dança comigo" performed by Sabrina.

The Portuguese national broadcaster, Rádio e Televisão de Portugal (RTP), broadcasts the event within Portugal and organises the selection process for the nation's entry. RTP confirmed Portugal's participation in the 2008 Eurovision Song Contest on 12 September 2007. The broadcaster has traditionally selected the Portuguese entry for the Eurovision Song Contest via the music competition Festival da Canção, with exceptions in 1988 and 2005 when the Portuguese entries were internally selected. Despite rumours of an internal selection due to the resignation of the RTP programmes director Nuno Santos, the broadcaster announced the organization of Festival da Canção 2008 in order to select the 2008 Portuguese entry on 22 January 2008.

Before Eurovision

Festival da Canção 2008 
Festival da Canção 2008 was the 44th edition of Festival da Canção that selected Portugal's entry for the Eurovision Song Contest 2008. Ten entries competed in the competition which took place on 9 March 2008 at the Teatro Camões in Lisbon. The show was hosted by Sílvia Alberto and broadcast on RTP1 and RTP Internacional as well as online via the broadcaster's official website rtp.pt.

Competing entries 
Ten producers were invited by RTP for the competition. The producers worked in coordination with their selected composers on the songs which were required to be created and submitted in the Portuguese language by 22 February 2008 in its final versions, while its performers were chosen by RTP. The selected producers were revealed between 24 and 30 January 2008, while the competing artists were revealed between 25 January and 15 February 2008.

Final 
The final took place on 9 March 2008. In addition to performances of the ten competing entries, each of the competing artists performed a cover version of a former Eurovision winning song both solo and as a group (with the songs "Waterloo" by ABBA, "Making Your Mind Up" by Bucks Fizz and "Hallejulah" by Milk and Honey). The winner, "Senhora do mar (negras águas)" performed by Vânia Fernandes, was selected solely by a public televote held in Portugal, France, Spain, Germany and Switzerland. Be-Dom and Hip Hop BCM performed as the interval acts.

Preparation 

Following Vânia Fernandes's victory at Festival da Canção 2008, the singer filmed the music video for "Senhora do mar (negras águas)" in Madeira and Porto Santo which was presented on 4 April 2008. An English language version of the song, titled "Lady of the Sea", was also recorded. Both the Portuguese and English versions of the song were released on a CD single ahead of the contest, which also included karaoke and instrumental edits and a remix by Portuguese DJ Rui da Silva.

Promotion 
Vânia Fernandes made several appearances across Europe to specifically promote "Senhora do mar (negras águas)" as the Portuguese Eurovision entry. On 5 April, Vânia Fernandes appeared during the Bulgarian BNT 1 morning show Vsichki pred ekrana where she performed together with 2006 Bulgarian contest entrant Mariana Popova. She also completed promotional activities in Malta between 27 and 30 April, including a performance of "Senhora do mar (negras águas)" during the NET talk show programme La Qomna Qomna, as well as in Turkey on 29 April where she performed together with 1996 and 1997 Turkish contest entrant Şebnem Paker.

At Eurovision 
It was announced in September 2007 that the competition's format would be expanded to two semi-finals in 2008. According to Eurovision rules, all nations with the exceptions of the host country and the "Big Four" (France, Germany, Spain and the United Kingdom) are required to qualify from one of two semi-finals in order to compete for the final; the top nine songs from each semi-final as determined by televoting progress to the final, and a tenth was determined by back-up juries. The European Broadcasting Union (EBU) split up the competing countries into six different pots based on voting patterns from previous contests, with countries with favourable voting histories put into the same pot. On 28 January 2008, a special allocation draw was held which placed each country into one of the two semi-finals. Portugal was placed into the second semi-final, to be held on 22 May 2008. The running order for the semi-finals was decided through another draw on 17 March 2008 and as one of the six wildcard countries, Portugal chose to perform last in position 19, following the entry from Macedonia.

In Portugal, the three shows were broadcast on RTP1 and RTP Internacional with commentary by Isabel Angelino. The second semi-final and the final were broadcast live, while the first semi-final was broadcast on delay. The Portuguese spokesperson, who announced the Portuguese votes during the final, was 2007 contest entrant Sabrina.

Semi-final

Vânia Fernandes took part in technical rehearsals on 14 and 18 May, followed by dress rehearsals on 21 and 22 May. The Portuguese performance featured Vânia Fernandes wearing a black dress with embroidered elements, designed by Portuguese designer Cátia Castel-Branco. Five backing vocalists were lined up behind Fernandes, dressed in white and performing a routine choreographed by Paulo Jesus: Evelyne Filipe, Jéssica Pereira, Joana Dias, Jonas Lopes and Luís Sousa. The stage lighting displayed blue colours and the LED screens displayed blue waves.

At the end of the show, Portugal was announced as having finished in the top 10 and subsequently qualifying for the grand final. This marked the first time that Portugal qualified to the final of the Eurovision Song Contest from a semi-final since the introduction of semi-finals in 2004. It was later revealed that Portugal placed second in the semi-final, receiving a total of 120 points.

Final 
Shortly after the second semi-final, a winners' press conference was held for the ten qualifying countries. As part of this press conference, the qualifying artists took part in a draw to determine the running order for the final. This draw was done in the order the countries were announced during the semi-final. Portugal was drawn to perform in position 13, following the entry from Turkey and before the entry from Latvia.

Vânia Fernandes once again took part in dress rehearsals on 23 and 24 May before the final. Vânia Fernandes performed a repeat of her semi-final performance during the final on 24 May. At the conclusion of the voting, Portugal finished in thirteenth place with 69 points.

Voting 
Below is a breakdown of points awarded to Portugal and awarded by Portugal in the second semi-final and grand final of the contest. The nation awarded its 12 points to Ukraine in the semi-final and the final of the contest.

Points awarded to Portugal

Points awarded by Portugal

References

2008
Countries in the Eurovision Song Contest 2008
Eurovision